Imad Noury (born 1983) is a Spanish-Moroccan filmmaker.

Biography 
Noury was born on January 6, 1983, in Casablanca. He is the son of renowned Moroccan filmmaker Hakim Noury, and Maria Pilar Cazorla, a Spanish producer. He has worked as an assistant on many of his father's films, and has co-directed all of his films with his older brother Swel Noury.

Filmography

Short films 

 1999: Coupable (Guilty) 
 2001: Pas de secrets (No secrets) 
 2003: Album de famille (Family album)

Feature films 

 2006: Heaven's Doors (Les portes du paradis)
 2009: The Man Who Sold The World 
 2012: Elle est diabétique 3

External links

References 

Living people
1983 births